Kazayak-Kutush (Qaźayaq-Qotoş) is a rural locality (a village) in Ulu-Telyaksky Selsoviet, Iglinsky District, Bashkortostan, Russia. The population was 41 as of 2010. There are 2 streets.

Geography 
Kazayak-Kutush is located 64 km east of Iglino (the district's administrative centre) by road. Rasmikeyevo is the nearest rural locality.

References 

Rural localities in Iglinsky District